Bhabendramohan Ray Chaudhury (17 October 1902 – 26 February 1984), better known as Bhaba Pagla, was an Indian lyricist, composer, and a devotee of goddess Kali. He is known for his contributions to Bengali folk music. His conventional education did not exceed the primary school level but his creations, mostly lyrics, had been sunk into a deep inner meaning and located in a high thought though common words used for cultural expression. The lyrics also had been composed by him with easy harmony to entertain the masses.

Biography
Bhaba Pagla was born as Bhabendramohan Chaudhury on 17 October 1902 at Amta in Manikganj, near Dhaka; a district in the united Bengal Province of British India (now in Bangladesh). He came of the a respectable family of small land owners of the Saha caste, and the surname of the family was Chowdhury, though Bhaba achieve his own title Pagla, the mad, a mad by the love for God. Bhaba's parents, Gajendra Mohan Chowdhury and his wife Gayasundari Devi had developed themselves highly in the way of devotion and had been blessed by many gurus and sadhus.

Bhaba Pagla had been leading a family life with Smt. Shaibalini Devi and he had been the father of three children.

Bhaba was dead against the publicity of the mystic power of him: he used to say "If people get to know about me, I'll become cow dung!". The Devotees of Bhaba Pagla transmit numerous narratives and testimonies on the miraculous powers of their master. One of which was a sketch of Goddess Kali which Bhaba drawn himself when appearing before him The Divine Mother offer herself as a model and ordered him to make a portrait of her. The miracle took place at the crematorium beside village Amta the native village of this sage, which he left after the independence of India.

Healing a cancer patient was another example of supernatural power of Bhaba Pagla. Mr. Nandalal Das was suffering from cancer and the fatal disease had risen at advance stage. On the certain way to death he came across the great Bhaba who cured him without any medicine but his mystic power of mind. Getting a new life Nandalal became earnest disciple and devotee to Bhaba Pagla and considering him as his spiritual master and served him at “BHOBAR HORBOLA MANDIR-DIGHA”, for next fifteen years, till his natural death on 13 Oct 2006.

Beyond his spiritual influence, BhabaPagla is more famous for his contribution in Bengali folk culture. The songs, he composed, are renowned all around of Bengal, India and Bangladesh. Many devotional songs of him have been published in records by a research group affiliated with France Government and his works are now subject to interest of many research scholar. University of Kalyani, in West Bengal, India, has included “BHABA PAGLAR GAN” (SONG OF BHABA PAGLA) into their academic curriculum and in Bangladesh Bengali Academy of Dacca's publication department brought out a biography of Bhabapagla “JIBAN O GAN” by name.

As an artist Bhaba was genius and his talent expressed diversity into many subjects like music, painting, sketching and needle work. He had inherited efficiency in playing various instruments. Amazing information is that Bhaba could play Harmonium by the help of his elbow and wrist without using a single finger. Once at his young age he was awarded with gold medal as a violinist. He used to beat a metal dish with spoons to create a symphonic rhythm.

Songs
Bhaba Pagla composed thousands of charming folk songs, which are mostly performed by Bauls, but also by Shyamasangit singers. Bhaba Pagla's songs are referred to by his devotees as spiritual songs for self-realization (sadhana sangit). The themes and the styles covered by his songs are numerous, drawing from various popular and religious repertoires of his time. His lyrics are profound and metaphorical, but also witty and humorous.

References

Further reading
 

1902 births
1984 deaths
Indian male songwriters
Indian male singer-songwriters
20th-century Indian male musicians
Musicians from West Bengal